Oscar Fulvio Giannino (born 1 September 1961) is an Italian journalist and politician: he is the former president of the free-market oriented party Act to Stop the Decline.

He was born in Turin, the capital city of Piedmont, Italy. He soon started his career as journalist. In 1984 he became a member of the national leadership of the Italian Republican Party, until 1994.
In March 2012 he was a speaker at the national congress of the Grand Orient of Italy in Rimini. 
In August 2012 Giannino founded the movement Act to Stop the Decline and in December he announced that he would run to become Prime Minister (Presidente del Consiglio dei Ministri) with his movement, during the 2013 Italian election.
He stepped down from the presidency (Capo della forza politica) of his movement after it was discovered that he had fabricated his résumé by adding false academic claims, such as a law degree in Italy and a master's degree in corporate finance and public finance at the University of Chicago Booth School of Business: the deception was discovered by the party co-founder and Giannino's colleague Luigi Zingales, professor at the Booth School of Business, who left the political association.

References 

|-

1961 births
Living people
Politicians from Turin
Italian Republican Party politicians
Democratic Alliance (Italy) politicians
Liberal Reformers politicians
Journalists from Turin
Italian male journalists
Act to Stop the Decline politicians